Anthony Hernandez may refer to:

 Anthony Hernandez (footballer) (born 1995), Gibraltarian footballer
 Anthony Hernandez (photographer) (born 1947), American photographer
 Anthony Hernandez (fighter) (born 1993), American mixed martial artist